HeySpace is a web-based task management application founded in 2018 by Time Solutions. The program is a mix of Slack and Trello, combining an online chat facet of the former with project management of the latter.

Time Solutions ─ a system manufacturer of HeySpace ─ is an IT company based in Wrocław, founded in 2009 by Kamil Rudnicki, a 21-years-old student back then.[1] The main investors of Time Solutions are Asseco Poland and Venture Incubator, which financed Time Solutions in 2011.

History 
HeySpace made its debut on May 3, 2018, when it was officially presented on Time Solutions' blog. To July 2018, it was used only by the company itself, and after that date, the app was made available  also to the rest of the world. The tool was inspired by the internal need of the company for combining the communication function provided by Slack with the task management function offered by apps such as Trello. Mixing both features in one tool allowed for greater integration of projects within the company.

Features 
HeySpace offers numerous features which aim is to facilitate team collaboration and communication.  First of all, the tool provides its user with a chat board that can be divided into private and public spaces. The same division concerns sticky notes boards.  Moreover, it is possible to create task sheets directly from the conversation level.

The user of HeySpace can also import their tasks from the currently used software (such as Asana, Trello, Jira, Todoist, or Wrike) via the available support.

Besides task management and collaboration, the tool enables percent-complete tracking, milestone tracking, status tracking, project planning, file sharing, workflow management, idea management, resource management and many more.

Reception 
On August 21, 2018, after appearing on ProductHunt, HeySpace received the #4 Product of the Day award. What is more, the application was granted ''Great User Experience 2018'' and ''Rising Star 2018'' awards by Finances Online. Besides, the tool has received many positive reviews around the world.

See also 
 Computer and network surveillance
 Project management software
Comparison of project management software

References 

Project management
Project management software
Task management software
Communication software